Mahurangi Regional Park is a regional park situated on the north-eastern coast of the Auckland Region of New Zealand's North Island. It is located in Rodney, north of the main Auckland urban area, and is owned and operated by Auckland Council.

Geography 

The part is located on either side of the entrance to the Mahurangi Harbour. The bulk of the regional park is found in Mahurangi West. In addition to this, two exclaves of the park are located on the eastern shores, in Scotts Landing.

References 

Rodney Local Board Area
Parks in the Auckland Region
Regional parks of New Zealand
Tourist attractions in the Auckland Region